Quinta Brunson (born December 21, 1989) is an American writer, producer, actress, and comedian. She is best known for creating, executive producing, co-writing, and starring in the ABC comedy series Abbott Elementary (2021–present). Brunson gained prominence for her self-produced Instagram series Girl Who Has Never Been on a Nice Date. She went on to produce and act in content for BuzzFeed Video, and developed two streaming series with BuzzFeed Motion Pictures.

At the 74th Primetime Emmy Awards, she became the first Black woman to be nominated three times in the comedy category, receiving nominations for: Outstanding Writing for a Comedy Series (which she won), Outstanding Comedy Series (as an executive producer), and Outstanding Lead Actress in a Comedy Series. Brunson was placed on the Time 100 Most Influential People of 2022 list.

Brunson has acted in the series iZombie, Single Parents, and Miracle Workers; provided voice work for Lazor Wulf and Magical Girl Friendship Squad; and starred in the first season of the HBO sketch comedy series A Black Lady Sketch Show.

Early life and education
Brunson was born and raised in West Philadelphia. Her name means "fifth" in Spanish and signifies that she is youngest of five children.  Her mother, Norma Jean Brunson, taught kindergarten. She was raised a Jehovah's Witness.

She has described herself as "obsessed" with comedy from the time she attended the Charter High School for Architecture & Design, and nurtured her interest by taking an improv class. Brunson attended Temple University and took classes at Second City in Chicago her sophomore year. She dropped out of school shortly after to pursue a career in comedy.

Career

2014–2017: Instagram and Buzzfeed
Brunson originally garnered fans online by posting comedic videos to her Instagram in 2014. In particular, her Girl Who Has Never Been on a Nice Date series went viral and grew her digital fan base. She then worked as a video producer for BuzzFeed Video after first freelancing for the company. Her videos primarily focused on problems experienced by twenty-somethings.

In 2016, Brunson sold two web series as a development partner with BuzzFeed Motion Pictures: one scripted comedy called Broke for Youtube Red, which she wrote, produced, and starred in; the second, Up for Adoption, was produced by Verizon's go90 video platform, which she also starred in. Brunson's performance in Broke was nominated for Best Acting in a Comedy at the Streamy Awards in 2017.

2018–present: A Black Lady Sketch Show and Abbott Elementary
Shortly after Brunson left BuzzFeed in 2018, she co-starred in her first network pilot, the CW pilot The End of the World as We Know It, but the show was not picked up by the network. She also wrote and produced a series called Quinta vs. Everything that streamed on Facebook Watch from 2017 to 2018. On October 4, 2018, it was announced that a pilot co-produced by Brunson, Larry Wilmore, and Jermaine Fowler would be developed by CBS into a multi-cam comedy called Quinta & Jermaine. The pilot would star Fowler and Brunson as longtime friends who must deal with an unplanned pregnancy; however, the show was not picked up.

In 2019, she appeared as Dr. Charli Collier and her twin sister, Laila, on the supernatural comedy-drama series iZombie, and also voiced multiple characters in the animated series Lazor Wulf. That fall, Brunson began to co-star and write in the HBO sketch comedy series A Black Lady Sketch Show, alongside Robin Thede, Gabrielle Dennis, and Ashley Nicole Black; but she left the second season due to scheduling conflicts. In 2020, Brunson co-starred in the Syfy animated series Magical Girl Friendship Squad, opposite Anna Akana.

In 2021, Brunson appeared in a recurring role on the third season of Miracle Workers, and in June, her debut book, She Memes Well, a collection of essays about her personal life and career, was released.

Brunson's single-camera pilot (previously titled Harrity Elementary) was picked up by ABC with the new title Abbott Elementary in May 2021. Brunson is also the writer, co-executive producer, and stars with Sheryl Lee Ralph, Lisa Ann Walter, Chris Perfetti, Tyler James Williams, and Janelle James. The series premiered on December 7, 2021 and received critical acclaim. It holds a 97% rating on Rotten Tomatoes based on 38 critics' reviews. Brunson received praise for bringing a fresh approach to network television with Abbott Elementary, named after her real-life former middle school teacher, Ms. Abbott. For the show's first season she was named to Time's 100 Most Influential People of 2022. In July 2022, Brunson and ABC were sued by writer Christine Davis in a copyright infringement case. In September 2022, Brunson won an Emmy for Outstanding Writing For a Comedy Series for the show, making her the first black woman to win that award solo.

Brunson has a guest starring role on the upcoming Party Down revival series.

In August 2022, Brunson signed a multi-year overall deal with Warner Bros. Television, the co-production studio of her show, Abbott Elementary.

Personal life
Brunson married sales manager Kevin Jay Anik in September 2021.

Accolades 
 2022 – Time 100 Most Influential People
 2022 – Philadelphia City Council resolution honoring Brunson for her creation of Abbott Elementary
 2022 – The Hollywood Reporters Women in Entertainment Power 100 list

Filmography

Music videos

Television

Film

Bibliography 
 She Memes Well, Houghton Mifflin Harcourt, publication date June 15, 2021,

Awards and nominations

References

External links

1989 births
Living people
20th-century African-American women
20th-century African-American people
21st-century African-American women writers
21st-century American women writers
21st-century African-American writers
21st-century American actresses
21st-century American comedians
21st-century American screenwriters
Actresses from Philadelphia
African-American actresses
African-American female comedians
African-American screenwriters
African-American television producers
American producers
American sketch comedians
American television actresses
American voice actresses
American women comedians
American women screenwriters
Best Musical or Comedy Actress Golden Globe (television) winners
BuzzFeed people
Comedians from Pennsylvania
Entertainers from Pennsylvania
Primetime Emmy Award winners
Temple University alumni